The IXI was the world's first digital audio player.  It was invented by Kane Kramer in 1979.

In 1981 Kramer filed for a UK patent. UK patent 2115996 was issued in 1985, and U.S. Patent 4,667,088 was issued in 1987. In 1988 Kramer's failure to raise the £60,000 required to renew the patent resulted in the patent entering the public domain, but he is still the owner of the designs.

IXI was around the size of a credit card and had a LCD screen and navigation and volume buttons. Four prototype models were built and a pre-production model went on sale at the APRS exhibition at Earls Court in London, in October 1986.

References

Original investor's report on the IXI from 1979 (PDF) Format

Digital audio players
Portable media players
Portable audio players